Ill Crag is a fell in the English Lake District. At , it is the fourth-highest peak in England, after Scafell Pike, Sca Fell, and Helvellyn. Ill Crag overlooks Eskdale and has splendid views across to Bowfell and Crinkle Crags.

Topography
It forms part of the Scafell chain, and lies about 1 km east of Scafell Pike. Broad Crag lies immediately to the west, between Ill Crag and the Pike.

Ascents
Ill Crag may be climbed en route to Scafell Pike, via a path from Esk Hause, but it is commonly passed by without going to the actual summit, which is rocky making progress slow. Ill Crag's summit is a few hundred metres to the south of the path from Esk Hause to Scafell Pike.

References

Hewitts of England
Fells of the Lake District
Nuttalls
Mountains under 1000 metres
Furths